Mitch Boyer (sometimes spelled 'Bowyer', 'Buoyer', 'Bouyer' or 'Buazer', or in Creole, 'Boye') (1837 – June 25, 1876) was an interpreter and guide in the Old West following the American Civil War. General John Gibbon called him "next to Jim Bridger, the best guide in the country". He was killed at the Battle of the Little Bighorn.

Family background
He was born Michel Boyer in 1837. His father, Jean-Baptiste Boyer, was a French Canadian who was employed by the American Fur Company, trading with Sioux in the Wyoming area. Mitch's mother was a Santee Sioux. His father was killed by Indians while trapping, about 1863. Mitch's Indian name was Kar-pash. He had three full sisters: Marie, Anne, and Thérèse, who seem to have been triplets born in 1840. He also had at least two half-brothers: John Boyer (c. 1845-1871), who was hanged at Fort Laramie for killing an Army scout in the first legal execution in Wyoming Territory, and Antoine Boyer (born 1852?), whom Walter Mason Camp interviewed in 1912. John, in an interview just before he was hanged, stated that there had been other siblings who had already died.

Boyer was an interpreter at Fort Phil Kearny in 1868. In the fall of 1869, he married a young Crow woman named Magpie Outside (or Magpie Out-of-Doors), who became known as Mary. Their first child, also named Mary, was born in 1870. Sometime later they also had a son, apparently named Tom, but eventually called James LeForge (see below).

Army scout and death at the Little Big Horn
Boyer became a guide for the 2nd U.S. Cavalry, working with the Northern Pacific Railroad's survey team. From 1872 on he was employed by the Crow Agency and the US Army.

In 1876 Lt. Col. George Armstrong Custer requested that Boyer be transferred to the 7th U.S. Cavalry as an interpreter for the Crow scouts when Gen. Alfred Terry ordered the 7th south from the Montana Column to search for hostile Indians. Custer's regular scouts were Ree (Arikara). However, for this mission, Terry had assigned six of Lt. James Bradley's Crow scouts to the 7th (including Curley). Boyer had the additional bonus of knowing the country well.

At the Crow's Nest, Boyer was one of the scouts who warned Custer about the size of the Indian village, which Custer claimed he couldn't make out. Boyer told him, "General, I have been with these Indians for 30 years, and this is the largest village I have ever known of." After failing to convince Custer, it is reported  Boyer gave away his possessions, convinced he would die in the coming battle. There was a report that Sitting Bull had offered a bounty of 100 ponies for Boyer's head.

When Custer's command was divided into 3 battalions, about noon, Boyer was assigned to accompany Custer, whose battalion would be almost completely wiped out. There were only about a dozen survivors of Custer's battalion, all of whom had left it before the battle began. Soldiers in Reno's fight claimed to have seen Custer on the bluffs watching the retreat, but this was later shown probably to have been Boyer and Curley, who had ridden ahead of the main force. Boyer stayed with Custer and was killed in the Battle of the Little Big Horn.

In 1984, a fire burned through much of the Custer Battlefield, enabling archaeological digs to be made. Part of a skull was found that was identified as Boyer's by comparison of the facial bones with a misidentified photograph. The skull fragment was found to the west of the monument on Custer Hill, at what is called the 'South Skirmish Line'.

Boyer seems to have been a flamboyant character. He was wearing a piebald calf's vest the day of the fatal battle.

After Boyer's death, his widow Mary was taken in by his close friend, Thomas Leforge. When his own wife died, Leforge married Mary and adopted her children. This is probably when Mitch's son was renamed, as Leforge had a son of his own named Tom. Mary died in 1916.

See also
 White Swan
 Half Yellow Face

Notes

References

 Connell, Evan S.; Son of the Morning Star: Custer And The Little Bighorn. (1985)
 Gray, John S.; Custer's Last Campaign (1991)
 Hammer, Ken, ed.; Custer in '76: Walter Camp's Notes on the Custer Fight.  Norman: University of Oklahoma, 1976.
 Weibert, Henry & Don; Sixty-Six Years in Custer's Shadow (1985)

External links
A-ca-po-re, Ute musician
Mitch Bouyer or Acapore?

1837 births
1876 deaths
People of the Great Sioux War of 1876
Santee Dakota people
American people of French-Canadian descent
American military personnel killed in the American Indian Wars
Battle of the Little Bighorn